HOK, formerly Hellmuth, Obata + Kassabaum and legally HOK Group, Inc., is an American design, architecture, engineering, and urban planning firm, founded in 1955.

As of 2018, HOK is the largest U.S.-based architecture-engineering firm and the fourth-largest interior design firm. The firm maintains more than 1,600 professional staff across a network of 24 offices, and is active in all major architectural specialties.

History

Founding 
HOK was established in St. Louis, Missouri, in 1955. The firm's name is derived from the surnames of its three founding partners: George F. Hellmuth, Gyo Obata and George Kassabaum, all graduates of the School of Architecture at Washington University in St. Louis. The design firm started with 26 employees and its three founders.

The practice's first building designs were schools in St. Louis suburbs, and St. Thomas Aquinas High School in Florissant was the first private/parochial school designed by the firm. Another prominent school they designed was the Saint Louis Priory School.

Early years 
By the mid-1960s, the firm was winning commissions across the United States and began to open additional offices, starting with San Francisco in 1966 for the design of a library at Stanford University and Dallas in 1968 for the master planning and design of Dallas/Fort Worth International Airport. Also in 1968, HOK launched its interior design practice. HOK also expanded into Washington, D.C., after winning the commission to design the Smithsonian National Air and Space Museum. In 1973, HOK established a presence in New York by acquiring Kahn & Jacobs, designers of many New York City skyscrapers. By the 1970s, the firm was operating internationally and in 1975 the firm was named as architect of the $3.5 billion King Saud University in Riyadh, at the time the single largest building project in the world. In 1979, George Kassabaum was elected into the National Academy of Design as an Associate Academician.

In 1983, HOK formed HOK Sport Venue Event, a subsidiary devoted entirely to designing sport stadiums, arenas, and convention centers, an architectural boom market at the time. In January 2009, the Board of HOK Group, Inc. and managers of HOK Sports Facilities, LLC transferred ownership of HOK Sport to leaders of that practice. The company became an independent firm, and rebranded itself as Populous.

Expansion and acquisitions 
HOK's first office outside the US opened in Hong Kong in 1984, and the second in London in 1987, a practice that would be expanded in 1995 by merging with the British architectural practice Cecil Denny Highton. As of April 2021, HOK operates offices in seven different countries including the US, China, India, and Canada, where it established its first offices in 1997 with the acquisition of Urbana Architects. The firm expanded into China in 2013, when it acquired the New York and Shanghai offices of hospitality design firm BBG-BBGM, creating one of the world's largest interior design firms, although BBG-BBGM's office in Washington, D.C. continues to operate as BBGM. By 2007, international work represented more than 40% of HOK's annual revenue.

Other domestic acquisitions include Caudill Rowlett Scott based in Houston, Texas, in November 1994, adding offices in Houston and Atlanta, and 360 Architecture in January 2015, a 200-person, Kansas City-based firm specializing in the design of stadiums, ballparks, arenas, recreation and wellness centers, and mixed-use entertainment districts. The acquisition enabled HOK to launch a new global Sports, Recreation, and Entertainment design practice after the breakaway of Populous, and to open new offices in Kansas City and Columbus, Ohio. This return to the firm's tradition of stadium architecture was buoyed on May 15, 2015, when the firm announced a multi-year partnership with the United Soccer League (USL) in the US to lead a stadium development, design and standards initiative to help house all USL clubs in soccer-specific stadiums across North America by the end of the decade.

Leadership 
In 2004, George Hellmuth's nephew, Bill Hellmuth, was named president of the firm. In 2012, HOK Chairman Bill Valentine retired after 50 years with the firm and was replaced by HOK Chief Executive Officer Patrick MacLeamy, FAIA. In January 2016, HOK announced that Bill Hellmuth would succeed Patrick MacLeamy as CEO, effective April 19, 2016, and he would later also assume the role of chairman when it was announced that Carl Galioto had been appointed president in April 2017.

Innovation and sustainable design 
In 1983, HOK introduced HOK Draw, computer-aided drafting software products that specialized in conceptual architectural design. In the early 2000s, HOK began using Building Information Modeling (BIM) to streamline the design and construction process. In 2012, Building Design + Construction ranked HOK the No. 1 BIM Architecture Firm. In 2013, DesignIntelligence magazine, based in part on the firm's leadership in buildingSMART and BIM, ranked HOK the No. 1 Design Firm for Technology Expertise.

HOK is generally regarded as one of the leading architectural companies in the area of sustainable design. Professionals in the firm authored one of the industry's most respected resources on the topic, "The HOK Guidebook to Sustainable Design," originally published in 2000 by John Wiley & Sons. A second edition of the book was published in 2005. In September 2008, to better integrate nature's innovations into the design of buildings, communities and cities worldwide, HOK announced an alliance with the Biomimicry Group, co-founded by Janine Benyus. In 2010, HOK and energy and daylighting consultant The Weidt Group completed design of Net Zero Court, a 170,735-square-foot, market-rate, zero-emissions class A commercial office building in St. Louis.

In 2013, HOK and Biomimicry 3.8 released the Genius of Biome report, a textbook for how to apply biomimicry design principles, and a year later in 2014, ORO Editions published “HOK Tall Buildings,” a 300-page book exploring the design of the contemporary high-rise.

In 2015, for the sixth consecutive year, the DesignIntelligence journal ranked HOK as a leader in sustainable and high-performance design. HOK currently has more than 750 LEED, BREEAM and WELL credentialed professionals and more than 300 green certified projects under various rating systems worldwide.

Global offices
United States: Atlanta; Chicago; Columbus, OH; Dallas; Houston; Kansas City; Los Angeles; New York; Philadelphia; St. Louis; San Francisco; Seattle; Summit, NJ; Tampa, FL; Washington, D.C.

Canada: Calgary, Ottawa, Toronto

Asia Pacific: Beijing, Hong Kong, Shanghai

Europe: London. Also leads European Architects Network (EAN) - affiliated firms in Amsterdam, Brussels, Madrid, Milan, Paris and Rome

India: Mumbai

Middle East: Dubai

Selected projects
 1962: The Priory Chapel, St. Louis, Missouri, United States
 1970: Houston Galleria, Houston, Texas, United States
 1970: Xerox PARC, Palo Alto, California, United States
 1975: King Saud University, Riyadh, Saudi Arabia
 1976: National Air and Space Museum, Washington, D.C., United States
 1977   Hulen Mall, Fort Worth, Texas, United States
 1979: Cecil H. Green Library, Stanford University, Stanford, California, United States
 1981: Moscone Center, San Francisco, California, United States
 1981: Metropolitan Square, St. Louis, Missouri, United States – Current location of HOK St. Louis office
 1982: Levi's Plaza, San Francisco, California, United States
 1983: King Khaled International Airport, Riyadh, Saudi Arabia
 1985: St. Louis Union Station Renovation and Redevelopment, St. Louis, Missouri, United States
 1986: BP Building Cleveland, Ohio, United States
 1986: Kellogg Company Headquarters Battle Creek, Michigan, United States
 1986: Riverchase Galleria Birmingham, Alabama, United States
 1991: 801 Grand, Des Moines, Iowa, United States (tallest building in Iowa)
 1992: Schapiro Center for Engineering and Physical Science Research (CEPSR), Columbia University, New York City, United States
 1993: Apple Inc. R&D Campus, Cupertino, California, United States
 1994: Independence Temple, Independence, Missouri, United States
 1995: Tokyo Telecom Center, Tokyo, Japan (co-designers)
 1996: Tuntex Sky Tower, Kaohsiung, Taiwan 
 1996–1997: Nortel Brampton Centre HQ, Brampton, Ontario, Canada
 1997: Foreign and Commonwealth Office Restoration, London, England
 1997: George Bush Presidential Library, College Station, Texas, United States (on the campus of Texas A&M University)
 1999: Northwestern Memorial Hospital Facility Replacement and Redevelopment, Chicago, Illinois, United States (co-designers)
 1999: Edificio Malecon Office Tower, Buenos Aires, Argentina
 1999: Boeing Leadership Center, St. Louis, Missouri, United States
 1999: American Airlines Arena (home of NBA Miami Heat), Miami, Florida, United States
 2000: Passenger Terminal Amsterdam, Amsterdam, The Netherlands
 2000: Nationwide Arena (home of NHL Columbus Blue Jackets), Columbus, Ohio, United States
 2001: United States Environmental Protection Agency Research Center, Research Triangle Park, North Carolina, United States (1.2 million-sq.-ft. campus)
 2002: Darwin Centre at the Natural History Museum, Passenger Terminal Cork, Cork Airport, Ireland
 2002: Alfred A. Arraj U.S. Courthouse, Denver, Colorado, United States
 2003: Steven F. Udvar-Hazy Center of the National Air and Space Museum, Chantilly, Virginia, United States
 2004: Harlem Hospital Center Master Plan and Patient Pavilion, New York City, United States
 2005: Cisco Systems Executive Briefing Center Interior Design, San Jose, California, United States
 2005: Terminal A at Logan International Airport, Boston, Massachusetts, United States (world's first LEED certified air terminal building)
 2005: Stockton Arena (home of ECHL Stockton Thunder), Stockton, California, United States
 2006: Lavasa Hill Station Master Plan and Design Guidelines, Moss Valley, Pune, India
 2006: Natural History Museum of the Adirondacks (The Wild Center), Tupper Lake, New York, United States
 2006: SJ Berwin European Headquarters Interior Design, London, England, (Business Week/Architectural Record Award winner)
 2007: Dubai Marina, Dubai, United Arab Emirates
 2007: Hyatt on the Bund, Shanghai, China
 2007: Sprint Center, Kansas City, Missouri, United States
 2008: Frost Art Museum, Florida International University, Miami, Florida, United States
 2008: Midfield Terminal at the Indianapolis International Airport, Indianapolis, Indiana, United States (master designer)
 2008: Kansas City Power & Light District, Kansas City, Missouri, United States
 2009: Doha City Centre, Doha, Qatar, (design of five hotel towers for largest retail development in the Middle East)
 2009: King Abdullah University of Science and Technology (KAUST), Thuwal, Saudi Arabia (Saudi Arabia's first LEED certified project and the world's largest LEED Platinum project)
 2009: Carnival House, head office of Carnival UK, Southampton, England
 2009: Bakrie Tower, Jakarta, Indonesia
 2009: Huntington Park (home of Triple-A MiLB Columbus Clippers), Columbus, Ohio, United States
 2010: Indira Gandhi International Airport – Terminal 3, Delhi, India (LEED Gold certification)
 2010: New Building 20 at NASA's Lyndon B. Johnson Space Center, Houston, Texas, (LEED Platinum certification)
 2010: MetLife Stadium (home of NFL New York Giants and NFL New York Jets), East Rutherford, New Jersey, United States
 2011: Salvador Dalí Museum, St. Petersburg, Florida
 2011: Brigade Gateway Enclave, Bengaluru, India
 2011: Keangnam Hanoi Landmark Tower, Hanoi, Vietnam (tallest building in Vietnam)
 2012: Canon USA Headquarters, Melville, New York
 2012: Baku Flame Towers, Baku, Azerbaijan
 2012: Harlem Hospital Center Mural Pavilion, New York City
 2013: San Francisco Mint Adaptive Reuse, San Francisco, California
 2013: BBC Broadcasting House Headquarters Workplace Strategy and Interior Design, London, England
 2013: Husky Stadium (home of University of Washington football), Seattle, Washington, United States
 2013: Auburn University Recreation & Wellness Center, Auburn, Alabama, United States
 2014: 535 Mission Street, San Francisco, California, United States
 2014: Anaheim Regional Transportation Intermodal Center, Anaheim, California, United States
 2014: National Oceanic and Atmospheric Administration Inouye Regional Center, Pearl Harbor, Hawaii, United States
 2014: Hamad International Airport Passenger Terminal Complex, Doha, Qatar
 2015: PayPal Park (home of MLS San Jose Earthquakes), San Jose, California, United States 
 2015: Porsche U.S. Headquarters and Customer Experience Center, Atlanta, Georgia
 2015: University of Chicago William Eckhardt Research Center, Chicago, Illinois
 2016: Abu Dhabi National Oil Company Headquarters, Abu Dhabi, United Arab Emirates
 2016: Rogers Place (home of NHL Edmonton Oilers), Edmonton, Alberta, Canada
 2016: Perot Tower, Mixed Use, Dallas, Texas
 2016: St Bartholomew's Hospital Redevelopment and King George V Building, London, England
 2017: University at Buffalo School of Medicine and Biomedical Sciences, Buffalo, New York
 2017: Capital Market Authority Tower, Riyadh, Saudi Arabia
 2017: Mercedes-Benz Stadium (home of the NFL's Atlanta Falcons and MLS Atlanta United FC) Atlanta, Georgia, United States
 2017: Little Caesars Arena (home of NHL's Detroit Red Wings and NBA's Detroit Pistons), Detroit, Michigan, United States
 2018: Hartsfield–Jackson Atlanta International Airport Passenger Terminal Modernization, Atlanta
 2018: LaGuardia Airport Central Terminal B, Queens, New York (Phase 1)
 2018: Central and Wolfe Campus, Sunnyvale, California, United States
 2018: Kentucky International Convention Center Redevelopment, Louisville, Kentucky, United States
 2018: LG Science Park, Seoul, South Korea
 2019: FC Barcelona New Palau Blaugrana Arena, Barcelona, Spain
 2019: Las Vegas Ballpark (home of Pacific Coast League Las Vegas Aviators), Summerlin, Nevada, United States
 2020: World Trade Center Towers, Chennai, India
 2020: Lynn Family Stadium (home of the USL Championship's Louisville City FC and the NWSL's Racing Louisville FC), Louisville, Kentucky, United States
 2020: Spire London Skyscraper, London, England
 2021: UPMC Vision and Rehabilitation Hospital at UPMC Mercy, Pittsburgh, Pennsylvania, United States

References

External links

 Official website

 
1955 establishments in Missouri
Architecture firms based in Missouri
Companies based in St. Louis
Design companies established in 1955